Ashim Biswas (born 14 July 1982) is an Indian professional footballer who plays as a forward for Diamond Harbour in the CFL 1st Division.

Club career

East Bengal
He had scored with a header against Mohammedan from a Syed Rahim Nabi cross, and then Ashim's cross was netted in by Edmilson Marques Pardal in the pre-quarterfinal of the 29th Federation Cup in 2007 at Guru Nanak Stadium in Ludhiana, match which East Bengal won 3-1.
In Calcutta Premier Division 2008, he had scored 2-0 against Mohammedan. He had scored the only goal in the 1-0 win over Prayag United. currently playing for Diamond Harbour Fc in calcutta premier A division.

Jamshedpur
On 23 July 2017, Ghosh was selected in the 14th round of the 2017–18 ISL Players Draft by Kerala for the 2017–18 Indian Super League season. He made his debut for the club on 10 December 2017 against Pune City. He came on as a 66th minute substitute for Siddharth Singh as Jamshedpur lost 1–0. He then scored his first goal for the club on 17 January 2018 in their match against the Kerala Blasters. He found the net in the 31st minute as Jamshedpur won 2–1.

On 12 April 2018, in Jamshedpur's quarter-final match during the Super Cup, Biswas scored the consolation for the club in a 5–1 defeat to Goa.

Statistics

International

Honours

India
SAFF Championship third place: 2003

References

External links
 Jamshedpur FC Profile.
 Profile on national-football-teams.

Indian footballers
1983 births
Living people
Footballers from Kolkata
Mohun Bagan AC players
East Bengal Club players
Salgaocar FC players
United SC players
Mohammedan SC (Kolkata) players
Jamshedpur FC players
India international footballers
I-League players
Association football forwards
Tollygunge Agragami FC players